Yves-François Blanchet  (born April 16, 1965) is a Canadian politician who has served as leader of the Bloc Québécois (BQ) since 2019. He has been the Member of Parliament (MP) for Beloeil—Chambly since the 2019 election.

Before federal politics, Blanchet was in provincial politics, serving as a Member of the National Assembly (MNA) for the Parti Québécois (PQ) from 2008 until his defeat in the 2014 election. He was Quebec's Minister of Sustainable Development, Environment, Wildlife and Parks from December 2012 to April 2014 under Premier Pauline Marois. Prior to his political career, Blanchet ran an artist management firm and was the president of ADISQ from 2003 to 2006.

Life and career
Blanchet was born April 16, 1965, in Drummondville, Quebec, to Pierrette Bédard, a nurse, and Raymond Blanchet, a technician and lineman. He is a graduate from the Université de Montréal where he obtained a bachelor's degree in history and anthropology in 1987. He later worked as a teacher and was a founder of an artist, disc and concert management firm, YFB Inc. while being the president of the ADISQ from 2003 to 2006. He was named the local business personality of the year by the Drummondville Chamber of Commerce, while he and associated artists received 10 Félix Awards.

Blanchet was elected to represent the riding of Drummond in the National Assembly of Quebec in the 2008 provincial election. In the 2012 election, he was reelected, this time in Johnson electoral district. He was defeated by Coalition Avenir Québec candidate André Lamontagne in the 2014 Quebec election. A member of the Parti Québécois (PQ), Blanchet was Minister of Sustainable Development, Environment, Wildlife and Parks from 2012 until 2014. He was also a member of the Youth National Committee of the Parti Québécois in 1988 as well as a regional director of the PQ.

Prior to becoming leader of the Bloc Québécois (BQ), he was a columnist with Le Nouvelliste and the program Les Ex, on ICI RDI.

Bloc Québécois
On November 26, 2018, Blanchet announced his candidacy for the leadership of the Bloc Québécois. As no other candidate had entered the race by the time nominations closed on January 15, 2019, Blanchet was officially acclaimed leader on January 17, 2019.

In the 2019 federal election, the Bloc polling number rose to his alignment towards the popular Francois Legault's CAQ government. S.E Fortin in the Journal de Montreal noted an article from Don Braid from the Calgary Herald  when arguing that people from the prairies province were more worried about Blanchet than environmentalists Dominic Champagne or Steven Guilbeault. He won his seat of Beloeil—Chambly. Under Blanchet's leadership, the BQ increased its number of seats from 10 in 2015, to 32 seats in 2019, both overtaking the NDP to become the third largest party in Canada and regaining official party status.

In the 2021 Canadian federal election, the Bloc Québécois led by Blanchet won 32 seats, unchanged from the prior election.

Personal life
Blanchet married and is now separated from Nancy Déziel.

In September 2020, Blanchet tested positive for COVID-19 shortly after his wife had tested positive earlier in the month, requiring him to self-isolate at his residence in Shawinigan during the COVID-19 pandemic in Quebec.

Electoral record

Federal results

Provincial results

|-
 
|Liberal
|Jacques Sigouin
|align="right"|10,860
|align="right"|32.54
|align="right"|

|}

References

External links

 
 Parti Quebecois biopage 

1965 births
Bloc Québécois MPs
Bloc Québécois leaders
French Quebecers
Living people
Parti Québécois MNAs
People from Drummondville
People from Shawinigan
Université de Montréal alumni
21st-century Canadian politicians
Members of the Executive Council of Quebec
Critics of multiculturalism